The occult refers to secret or hidden knowledge, usually of a mystical nature. See pseudoscience.

Occult may also refer to:

 Occult (film), a 2009 Japanese horror film
 The Occult: A History, a 1971 nonfiction book by Colin Wilson
 Doctor Occult, a DC Comics magic-using detective character
 Occult fracture, a fracture not readily visible on radiography
 Fecal occult blood, blood in the feces that is not visibly apparent
 Occultation, when one object is hidden by another object that passes between it and the observer, in astronomy or other situations
 Alias of the Marvel Comics character Peepers
 A local term for the transgender community in Myanmar; see

See also

 The Occult Review, a British illustrated monthly magazine published between 1905 and 1951
 The Occult World, a book originally published in 1881 in London